Eric Harrington (June 6, 1820 - September 4, 1898) was an Ontario businessman and political figure. He represented Renfrew South in the Legislative Assembly of Ontario as a Conservative member from 1871 to 1874.

He was a merchant in Arnprior and served as warden for Renfrew County. He died in 1898.

References

External links 

The Canadian parliamentary companion and annual register, 1872, HJ Morgan 

1820 births
1898 deaths
People from Arnprior, Ontario
Progressive Conservative Party of Ontario MPPs